Zamin Ki Dost (pen name of Willimina Leonora Armstrong) (August 14, 1866 – November 2, 1947) was an American physician, writer, and lecturer. She is best known for her book Incense of Sandalwood (1904) and stories of India written in collaboration with Will Levington Comfort and published as Son of Power (1920).

Early life and education 
Willimina Leonora Armstrong was born in Nebraska in 1866, the daughter of William Leonard Armstrong and Elizabeth Summers Armstrong (1830-1870). Her father was a Union Army surgeon in the American Civil War. She was educated in Philadelphia.

Career 
In 1887 she went to India as a medical missionary and served with her older sister, physician Saleni Armstrong-Hopkins. In 1901 she settled in Los Angeles teaching philosophy, and writing stories and poems. In 1904 she published the book Incense of Sandalwood where she gathered her experience of living in India. She wrote eighteen stories of India under the pen name Zamin Ki Dost published in collaboration with Will Levington Comfort as Son of Power. She also composed songs. Armstrong was sued in 1913 for compelling a loan from one of her students with hypnotism.

Death 
Willimina Leonora Armstrong died in 1947, and is buried at Glen Haven Memorial Park, Sylmar, California. Her papers are in the UCLA Library, Department of Special Collections.

Works

Books 

 1904 – Willimina Leonora Armstrong, Incense of the Sandalwood
 1920 – Will Levington Comfort, Willimina Leonora Armstrong, Son of Power
 1931 – Will Levington Comfort, Zamin ki Dost, Caroline Renner, Bestien und Heilige 
1957 – Essential things to know and do, compiled by Noor Zhan

Songs 

 1908 – Zamin Ki Dost, Have no Fear

 1908 – Zamin Ki Dost, Armageddon
 1908 – Zamin Ki Dost, Light of my eyes
1908 – Zamin Ki Dost, I hear his voice calling me
1908 – Zamin Ki Dost, America invincible; Office for our dead
1908 – Zamin Ki Dost, Lullabye
1908 – Zamin Ki Dost, A hymn to world peace; Office for our dead
1908 – Zamin Ki Dost, The great transmuter
1908 – Zamin Ki Dost, Uncle Samuel's men

References

External links 

 Willimina Leonora Armstrong on Find a Grave

Writers from Nebraska
20th-century American women physicians
20th-century American physicians
20th-century American women writers
1866 births
1947 deaths
Burials in California
Writers from Los Angeles
Physicians from California
Physicians from Nebraska
Writers about India
American hypnotists